Melksham House is a Grade II listed house, situated 150 metres west of the Market Place in the town of Melksham, Wiltshire, England.

The house was built between the 17th and early 18th century, although records show a building on this site since about 1608.  In 1699 Richard Coxeter sold the property to Sir Walter Long, after which time various replacements and extensions were added over the years, while the house continued in the ownership of the Long family.

During the 19th century the house had a succession of owners, including (from 1866) Edward Barnwell, schoolmaster, archaeologist and antiquarian, who financed the building of St Andrew's church in the Forest area of the town. After the house was bought in 1895 by Charles Awdry of Shaw Hill House, the Blathwayt family were tenants – among them George Blathwayt, appointed High Sheriff of Wiltshire in 1916.

In 1920 the house and surrounding  was in the ownership of the Avon Rubber Company, purchased for use as the company club and sports centre for the "social welfare of their employees". The formal opening of the club took place on 11 December 1920, but just days later a fire broke out destroying much of the house, and all that could be salvaged was the façade which has remained intact to this day. The damaged part of the house was rebuilt in a manner more suited to a sports club. In 1963, Nikolaus Pevsner wrote that the house was "... alas so much pulled about that it cannot count any longer as a C17 building".

In 1997, Avon Rubber sold its tyre interest to Cooper Tire & Rubber Company of Findlay, Ohio, United States, and included in this sale was Avon's  manufacturing site in Melksham and the Melksham House sports and social club. The site was sold in 2011 to Wiltshire Council, and in 2021 work began to redevelop it into a "campus" of council and health services, although the future fate of Melksham House is still to be determined.

The sports ground on the southern part of the site was the home of Melksham Town F.C. from 1926, and was also used by Melksham Rugby Club. In January 2017, both clubs moved to new facilities at Oakfields on the eastern edge of the town.

References

Houses completed in the 18th century
Country houses in Wiltshire
Grade II listed buildings in Wiltshire
Grade II listed houses
Melksham